Bagani (1.093 m above sea level) is a settlement on the south-western banks of the Okavango River in the Kavango East Region, Namibia,  east of Rundu and near the Popa Falls on the Okavango River. Bagani has a population of around 2.000 inhabitants and is homestead of the local Mbukushu kings. 

On the opposite, north-eastern banks of the river lies Bufalo in Caprivi and the two towns are linked via a nearby border post.

History
The history of Bagani (Mbukushu: "the old place") is closely linked with the history of the Mbukushu people, the easternmost of the five kingdoms of the Kavango people. Successor of king Mayavero I. became fumu Mbambo. Bagani was founded in 1820 and 1880. 

Since independence of Namibia in 1990 and in particularly since an ongoing decentralisation policy, Bagani has gained some investments.

Economy and infrastructure 
Compared to many other villages in Namibia, Bagani is still underdeveloped. It suffered from a bad infrastructure and the political unrest in neighboring Angola. Until then, the economy of Bagani was characterized by small farmers with only few general services.

Schools 
 Bagani Combined School

References

Populated places in Kavango East
Angola–Namibia border crossings
History of Namibia
1820 establishments in Africa